Lilly Ajarova (born in 1969) is a Ugandan conservationist and tourism expert. She is the chief executive officer of the Uganda Tourism Board (UTB), the Ugandan government agency that is charged with promoting the country as a tourism destination. She was appointed to that position on 10 January 2019.

Before that, from 2005 until 2019, she served as the executive director of Chimpanzee Sanctuary & Wildlife Conservation Trust, the owner/operator of Ngamba Island Chimpanzee Sanctuary, on Lake Victoria.

Background and education
She was born in Uganda in early 1969 (January or February). She attended local primary and secondary schools. She studied at Makerere University, Uganda's oldest and largest public university, graduating with a Bachelor of Science in Psychology and Sociology. Her second degree is Master of Business Administration, obtained from the Eastern and Southern African Management Institute (ESAMI), in 2004. Lilly also holds a post graduate diploma in Hotel and Tourism Management from International Institute of Tourism and Management in Austria. In addition, she has a certificate of competence in Board Matters, awarded by the Oslo and Akershus University College of Applied Sciences.

Career
For over 8 years, from 1996 until 2005, Ms Ajarova worked at the Uganda Wildlife Authority, as the Tourism Development and Marketing Manager. In that capacity, she was responsible for the development of tourism services in Uganda's national parks.

From there she went to Chimpanzee Sanctuary & Wildlife Conservation Trust, where she was the executive director for fourteen years. While there, she served as a member of the Uganda Tourism Board. She was the chairperson of the committee that classified and graded Uganda's hotels in 2015.

In January 2019, she was appointed to head UTB, replacing Stephen Asiimwe. Her deputy at UTB is Bradford Ochieng. She was replaced as executive director at the Chimpanzee Sanctuary Trust by Dr. Joshua Rukundo. She handed over that office on 5 March 2019.

Other considerations
Ms Lilly Ajarova is the recipient of the:

(1) National Golden Jubilee Award 2015

(2) Tourism Excellence Award 2017

(3) Wildlife Conservation Award  2017 

(4) Country Winner in the Welfare & Civil Society Organization sector of CEO Global's Most Influential Women in Business & Government, 2018 Awards

See also
 Allen Kagina
 Doris Akol
 Shakila Rahim Lamar
 Gladys Kalema-Zikusoka
 Amos Wekesa

References

External links
Website of Uganda Tourism Board
Kiwanda announces new bosses at UTB
Ajarova: I Am Free-Spirited And Compassionate As of 20 July 2019.

1969 births
Living people
Makerere University alumni
Ugandan conservationists
Ugandan women business executives
Ugandan business executives
Ugandan women chief executives
Eastern and Southern African Management Institute alumni